The Villar del Arzobispo Formation is a Late Jurassic to possibly Early Cretaceous geologic formation in eastern Spain. It is equivalent in age to the Lourinhã Formation of Portugal. It was originally thought to date from the Late Tithonian-Middle Berriasian, but more recent work suggests a Kimmeridigan-Late Tithonian, possibly dating to the Early Berriasian in some areas. The Villar del Arzobispo Formation's age in the area of Riodeva in Spain has been dated based on stratigraphic correlations as middle-upper Tithonian, approximately 145-141 million years old. In the area of Galve, the formation potentially dates into the earliest Cretaceous.

Most of the unit consists of siliciclastic mudstone, however the lower portion of the formation is dominated by bioclastic, oolitic and peloidal limestone, while channelized sandstone and conglomerate is found in the  middle portion of the unit. While the lower part of the formation was deposited in an inner carbonate platform, the upward gradation into mudstone in the middle and upper portions of the formation represents a change in depositional environment to paralic and alluvial plain conditions.

Dinosaur remains are found throughout the unit, but are more abundant and better preserved in the terrestrially deposited middle-upper sections.  Remains of the stegosaurid Dacentrurus were recovered in the Barranco Conejero locality in this formation.  Over the years, other stegosaurian remains have been discovered in this formation, but none have yet been referred to a specific genus. Turiasaurs and brachiosaurids are also known from the formation. The formation is also well known for its fossil footprints, representing many different taxa.

Fossil content

Correlation

See also 
 List of dinosaur-bearing rock formations
 List of stratigraphic units with indeterminate dinosaur fossils

References

Further reading 
 L. Alcalá, A. Cobos, E. Espilez, F. Gascó, L. Mampel, C. M. Escorza, and R. Royo-Torres. 2012. Icnitas de dinosaurios en la Formación Villar del Arzobispo de Ababuj (Teruel, España) [Dinosaur footprints from the Villar del Arzobispo Formation in Ababuj (Teruel, Spain)]. Geogaceta 51:35-38
 J. L. Barco. 2005. Estudio y comparación del esqueleto axial de un saurópodo (Dinosauria, Sauropodomorpha) procedente de la Formación Villar del Arzobispo (Titónico-Berriasiense) de Galve, Teruel [Study and comparison of the axial skeleton of a sauropod (Dinosauria, Sauropodomorpha) from the Villar del Arzobispo Formation (Tithonian-Berriasian) of Galve, Teruel]. Treballs del Museu de Geología de Barcelona 13:15-59
 J. L. Barco, J. I. Canudo, J. I. Ruiz-Omeñaca and R. Royo-Torres. 1999. Bones, teeth and tracks: about sauropod dinosaur remains from Aragón (northeastern Spain). In J. I. Canudo & G. Cuenca-Bescós (eds.), IV European Workshop on Vertebrate Paleontology, Albarracin, Spain. Universidad de Zaragoza 22-23
 M. L. Casanovas-Cladellas, J. V. Santafé-Llopis, J. Pereda-Suberbiola and C. Santisteban-Bové. 1995. Presencia, por primera vez en España, de dinosaurios estegosaurios (Cretácico Inferior de Aldea de Losilla, Valencia) [Presence, for the first time in Spain, of stegosaurian dinosaurs (Lower Cretaceous of Aldea de Losilla, Valencia)]. Revista Española de Paleontología 10(1):83-89
 A. Cobos and F. Gascó. 2013. New vertebral remains of the stegosaurian dinosaur Dacentrurus from Riodeva (Teruel, Spain). Geogaceta 53:17-20
 A. Cobos, R. Royo-Torres, L. Alcalá and L. Mampel. 2010. An Iberian stegosaurs paradise: The Villar del Arzobispo Formation (Tithonian–Berriasian) in Teruel (Spain). Palaeogeography, Palaeoclimatology, Palaeoecology 293(1-2):223-236
 F. Gascó, A. Cobos, R. Royo-Torres, L. Mampel, and L. Alcalá. 2012. Theropod teeth diversity from the Villar del Arzobispo Formation (Tithonian–Berriasian) at Riodeva (Teruel, Spain). Palaeobiodiversity and Palaeoenvironments
 R. Royo-Torres, A. Cobos, and L. Alcalá. 2008. Primeros restos directos de dinosaurios en la Sierra de Albarracín (Teruel) [First direct remains of dinosaurs in the Sierra de Albarracín (Teruel)]. In J. I. Ruiz-Omeñaca, L. Piñuela and J. C. García-Ramos (eds), XXIV Jornadas de la Sociedad Española de Paleontología, 15–18 October 2008, Museo del Jurásico de Asturias (MUJA), Colunga, Spain, Libro de Resúmenes 189-190
 R. Royo-Torres, A. Cobos, A. Aberasturi, E. Espílez, I. Fierro, A. González, L. Luque, L. Mampel, and L. Alcalá. 2007. Riodeva sites (Teruel, Spain) shedding light to European sauropod phylogeny. Geogaceta 41:183-186
 B. Sánchez-Hernández, M. J. Benton, and D. Naish. 2007. Dinosaurs and other fossil vertebrates from the Late Jurassic and Early Cretaceous of the Galve area, NE Spain. Palaeogeography, Palaeoclimatology, Palaeoecology 249:180-215
 C. d. Santisteban, B. Vila, and M. Suñer. 2007. Huellas de dinosaurios conservadas en materiales del cortejo transgresivo en cauces encajados. Jurásico superior y Cretácico inferior de Alpuente, Valencia [Dinosaur footprints preserved in deposits of the transgressive systems tract in incised valleys. Upper Jurassic and Lower Cretaceous of Alpuente, Valencia ]. Geogaceta 42:79-82

Geologic formations of Spain
Jurassic System of Europe
Jurassic Spain
Tithonian Stage
Shale formations
Sandstone formations
Marl formations
Deltaic deposits
Fluvial deposits
Ichnofossiliferous formations
Paleontology in Spain
Formations